Labeo macrostoma is fish in genus Labeo from the Congo Basin.

References 

Labeo
Fish described in 1898